Johann Bach may refer to:

 Johann Sebastian Bach (1685–1750), German composer and musician
 Johann Christian Bach (1735–1782), J.S. Bach's youngest son
 Johann Ambrosius Bach (1645–1695), J.S. Bach's father
 Johannes Bach (1604–1673), great-uncle of the former, also a composer

See also
Johann Christoph Bach (disambiguation)